In mathematics, the Erdős–Turán inequality bounds the distance between a probability measure on the circle and the Lebesgue measure, in terms of Fourier coefficients. It was proved by Paul Erdős and Pál Turán in 1948.

Let μ be a probability measure on the unit circle R/Z. The Erdős–Turán inequality states that, for any natural number n,

where the supremum is over all arcs A ⊂ R/Z of the unit circle, mes stands for the Lebesgue measure,

are the Fourier coefficients of μ, and C > 0 is a numerical constant.

Application to discrepancy

Let s1, s2, s3 ... ∈ R be a sequence. The Erdős–Turán inequality applied to the measure

yields the following bound for the discrepancy:

This inequality holds for arbitrary natural numbers m,n, and gives a quantitative form of Weyl's criterion for equidistribution.

A multi-dimensional variant of (1) is known as the Erdős–Turán–Koksma inequality.

Notes

Additional references
 

Inequalities
Turán inequality
Theorems in approximation theory